The 2015 Duke City Gladiators season was the team's first season as a professional indoor football franchise, first as the "Duke City Gladiators", and first as a member of Champions Indoor Football (CIF). The Venom were led by head coach Dominic Bramante. One of nine teams in the CIF for the 2015 season, the Gladiators played their home games at Tingley Coliseum in Albuquerque, New Mexico.

Season summary
The CIF's announced schedule for the 2015 season was disrupted when the New Mexico Stars abruptly postponed their entry into the league on February 21, just one week before the season began. On March 3, the Albuquerque-based Duke City Gladiators were announced as a late entry into the league, partially replacing the Stars in the CIF schedule with a plan to play 11 games in 2015. The Gladiators' schedule was a mix of league games and non-league games because of prior scheduling maneuvers and arena availability.

Although hastily assembled, the Gladiators were able to pick up many key personnel from the unexpected temporary shutdown of the New Mexico Stars. This experience allowed them amass a 5–4 record during their unexpectedly shortened debut season. Originally scheduled for just 9 league games, the Gladiators' final home game was won by forfeit after the Sailna Bombers were ejected from the CIF on May 28. Of their four losses, only the season opener against the Texas Revolution was a blowout. The other three losses were by just 4 points, 3 points, and 5 points, respectively. Duke City also played a pair of non-league exhibition games, winning both.

Off-field moves
The team opened training camp on March 15. Their first indoor practice session was March 24. Regular season promotions included Hispanic Heritage Night on March 28 and Public Service Day on April 26.

The team averaged about 1,000 fans per home game with a peak of 1,200 during the home season finale on April 26.

Awards and honors
Each week of the regular season, the CIF names league-wide Players of the Week in offensive, defensive, and special teams categories. For Week 12, the CIF named quarterback Kasey Peters as the Offensive Player of the Week. For Week 13, the CIF named defensive back Jayson Serda as the Defensive Player of the Week.

Schedule
Key:

Regular season

 Exhibition game against non-league opponent.
 Won by forfeit; game ended by officials after fight just before halftime.
 Duke City alternate home site as Tingley Coliseum was unavailable in June
 Game cancelled after Salina Bombers ejected from league on May 28, 2015.

Roster

Standings

Playoffs

References

External links
Duke City Gladiators official website
Duke City Gladiators at Our Sports Central

Duke City Gladiators
2015 in sports in New Mexico
American football in New Mexico
Sports in Albuquerque, New Mexico